The B. F. Keith Circuit was a chain of vaudeville theaters in the United States and Canada owned by Benjamin Franklin Keith for the acts that he booked. Known for a time as the United Booking Office, and under various other names, the circuit was managed by Edward Franklin Albee, who gained control of it in 1918, following the death of Keith's son Andrew Paul Keith.

History
In 1928 the theaters owned by Benjamin Franklin Keith and Edward Franklin Albee and Martin Beck's Orpheum Circuit merged to form the Keith-Albee-Orpheum circuit. The combined theater chain now had over 700 theaters in the United States and Canada. They had a combined seating capacity 1.5 million. 15,000 vaudeville performers will be booked through the new entity.

Notable performers
 Rita Bell (1893-1992), singer, entertainer

See also
Orpheum Circuit
Chitlin' Circuit
Borscht Belt

References

Movie theatre chains in the United States
Vaudeville theaters